Yadir Drake Dominguez (born April 12, 1990) is a Cuban professional baseball outfielder for the Leones de Yucatán of the Mexican Baseball League.

Career

Amateur career 
Drake played for the Matanzas team in the Cuban National Series.

He defected to Mexico in 2011. He then played with a couple of semi-professional minor league teams in Mexico before participating in a workout for Major League Baseball scouts in August 2014.

Los Angeles Dodgers 
He was signed as an international free agent by the Los Angeles Dodgers. He hit .310 in seven games for the class-A Great Lakes Loons of the Midwest League at the start of the 2015 season and was promptly promoted to the Advanced-A Rancho Cucamonga Quakes of the California League. After another seven games for the Quakes (where hit .407) he was again quickly promoted, this time to the AA Tulsa Drillers of the Texas League. In 106 games for Tulsa, he hit .269. After the season, he was selected to the roster for the Mexico national baseball team at the 2015 WBSC Premier12.

He returned to Tulsa to start the 2016 season. He hit only .109 in 19 games and was released on May 27, 2016.

Generales de Durango
Drake signed with the Generales de Durango of the Mexican League for the 2017 season and hit .385 in 71 games for them with 14 homers and 61 RBI. Champion bate 2017 LMB

Hokkaido Nippon-Ham Fighters 
On June 29, 2017, the Hokkaido Nippon-Ham Fighters of Nippon Professional Baseball announced that they had signed him for the remainder of the season.

Return to Durango
Drake re-signed with the Generales de Durango for the 2018 season.

Sultanes de Monterrey 
On April 28, 2018, Drake was traded to the Sultanes de Monterrey of the Mexican Baseball League.

Leones de Yucatán 
On December 10, 2019, Drake was traded to the Leones de Yucatán of the Mexican League. Drake did not play in a game in 2020 due to the cancellation of the Mexican League season because of the COVID-19 pandemic.

Personal 
Drake became a naturalized Mexico citizen.

References

External links

1990 births
Living people
Cañeros de Los Mochis players
Charros de Jalisco players
Defecting Cuban baseball players
Delfines de Ciudad del Carmen players
Generales de Durango players
Great Lakes Loons players
Hokkaido Nippon-Ham Fighters players
Leones de Yucatán players
Mexican baseball players
Mexican expatriate baseball players in Japan
Mexican expatriate baseball players in the United States
Mexican League baseball outfielders
Mexican people of Cuban descent
Naturalized citizens of Mexico
Nippon Professional Baseball outfielders
Sportspeople from Matanzas
Rancho Cucamonga Quakes players
Sultanes de Monterrey players
Tigres de Aragua players
Cuban expatriate baseball players in Venezuela
Tulsa Drillers players
2015 WBSC Premier12 players
2023 World Baseball Classic players